Roseville Road station is an at-grade light rail station on the Blue Line of the Sacramento RT Light Rail system operated by the Sacramento Regional Transit District. The station is located in the median of Interstate 80 at its intersection with Roseville Road, after which the station is named, in the city of North Highlands, California.

The station, along with a 1,087 space park and ride lot, reused a partially built, but later abandoned freeway project.

Many commuters who drive to light rail, even those who live closer to the Watt/I-80 stations, use the Roseville Road station since it has a large, reasonably well-patrolled parking lot, and is easier to reach by car.

Platforms and tracks

References 

Sacramento Regional Transit light rail stations
Railway stations in the United States opened in 1987
Railway stations in highway medians